The Antiguan Carnival is a celebration of the emancipation of slavery in the country held annually from the end of July to the first Tuesday in August. The most important day is that of the j'ouvert (or juvé), in which brass and steel bands perform for much of the island's population. Barbuda's Carnival, held in June, is known as Caribana. The Antiguan and Barbudan Carnivals replaced the Old Time Christmas Festival in 1957, with hopes of inspiring tourism in Antigua and Barbuda. Some elements of the Christmas Festival remain in the modern Carnival celebrations.

It is a ten-day festival of colorful costumes, beauty pageants, talent shows, and especially good music.  The festivities, which celebrate emancipation, range from the Party Monarch and Calypso Monarch competitions of Calypsonians, the Panorama steel band competition, and the spectacular Parade of Bands to the Miss Antigua Pageant and the Caribbean Queen's Competition. In addition to these major events, the nonstop revelry of this eleven-day carnival includes innumerable smaller festivities, including local concerts, food fairs, parades, and cultural shows.

History of Carnival
For the history of the festival you have to step back in time to 1 August 1834 when slavery was abolished. People immediately celebrated by taking to the streets to celebrate their freedom and express their joy and happiness. Over the years there was a return to this informal celebration until 1957 when the Old Time Christmas Festival, a festival of much culturally significance, was replaced in 1957 by Antigua's Carnival. The Antiguan Christmas Festival included several elements that have been adopted into the modern Carnival.

Christmas Festival traditions include both music and dance, especially related to masquerades and iron bands. The highland fling is a common Christmas Festival dance, also played in the modern Carnival, performed by people wearing Scottish kilts, masks made of wire and bearing whips of cowhide. Dancers wearing banana leaves and animal horns took part in the John Bull, while carolers paraded with long poles covered in lanterns, called carol trees, singing with accompaniment by the concertina. Stilt dancers in robes, called the Moko Jumbie, Jumpa-Ben or Long Ghosts, were also common, and were accompanied by kettle and bass drums, fife, triangle (cling-a-ching) and the boompipe, made from a plumbing joint one meter long.

There are several different musical forms featured during Carnival. Calypso, the oldest, has its roots in slavery; a common explanation of its origins is that it began as a way for slaves, who were forbidden to speak in the fields, to communicate with each other. It is a polyglot, improvisational form that depends largely upon the skill of a soloist, (the calypsonian) who weaves the sounds of many cultures into a lyrical whole. Calypso competitions have long been a highlight of Carnival.

Steel drum music was created when the bamboo percussion instruments traditionally used to back up calypso were replaced by hammered steel pans cut from oil drums. Whereas there is no dispute that the steel pan was developed in Trinidad, the indigenous development of the steel band in Antigua and Barbuda was an outgrowth of the iron bands which were prominent at Christmas time.  Steel drum music has been an important part of Carnival since that time, and Antigua is home to many of the Caribbean's finest steel bands. Soca is a musical form that grafts the slower beat of American soul music to the upbeat tempos of calypso. Soca began in the 1970s, and by the middle of the 1980s it had become an integral feature of Carnival.

Parades and Mas'

Opening Parade and Ceremony

Antigua's carnival officially kicks off with an opening parade through the city of St. John's. Bands and troupes come out in T-shirts bearing the insignia of their respective companies. Floats, which were big in the past, have begun to see a resurgence in their popularity. The participants of various competitions also make a strong appearance in the Opening parade.

The typical parade route is usually like the following: The Parade will begin at 3:00 pm from Parliament Drive, and turn unto Queen Elizabeth Highway. From there it will turn right onto Independence Drive, left onto Redcliffe Street continue on until it turns onto Thames Street. From there it will move up High Street, back onto Independence Drive, around the round-about by government house and then finally into Carnival City through the north gate.

The parade concludes at "Carnival City" (the official title given to the Antigua Recreation Ground during the carnival season). There the opening ceremony follows and the contestants for the various carnival competitions make a final public appearance before their shows. The opening ceremony usually finishes with fireworks.

Children's Carnival
The Children's Carnival parade is set aside so that the children may really enjoy the carnival festivities to the fullest. They march through the streets as well and finish the parade at Carnival City.

The children come out in their costumes and portray different themes, taken from fairy tales etc. Cheerleading has also permeated into Antigua's carnival. At Carnival City the children enter the Prince and Princess competitions. Here each mas troupe enters a boy and girl who wear a costume in the hopes of winning the prince and princess competition. They are having their own fun.

J'ouvert
Like j'ouvert all over the world, Antigua's is characterized by much revelry. Patrons wake up early at around 3 or 4 am and go into St. John's where they find their favorite bands and "jam" with them along the route. There is much drinking, more jamming, painting of the bodies with blue and brown paint, and people who wear colourful costumes.

Carnival Monday and Tuesday
Antigua's carnival festivities conclude on the first Monday and Tuesday in August, dubbed Carnival Monday and Tuesday, official holidays. After J'ouvert Morning on Monday morning revelers come back into St. Johns in the afternoon to march through St. John's.

The troupes, bands and floats all return the very next afternoon to do it again but on a different route. This is dubbed Carnival Tuesday. The parade culminates at Carnival City where the different troupes are awarded prizes and the Road March king is decided upon.

List of Antiguan Mas' Troupes and Groups:
 Vitus
 Dynamics
 Revellers
 Myst
 Showcase
 Exotic
 Passion
 Solid Mas
 Wadadli Madness
 Ali and Associates
 Extreme Mas
 Fantasy 268
 Ali and Associates
 Insane

Pageants

Teen Splash
Teen Splash formerly the Teenage Pageant is a highly anticipated show on the carnival calendar. It pits youth of both sexes from different secondary schools around Antigua against each other. In the past there was a Mister and Miss Teen Splash but at present there is only one winner. The teens come up against each other in four segments:
 Personality and Aspiration
 Performing Talent
 Research
 Question and Answer

Queen of Carnival
The Queen of Carnival show is the most prestigious and coveted pageant title in Antigua and Barbuda. Beautiful young ladies from all over the island take part in the competition that has propelled many into the public eye. Many doors can be opened for the winner of such a "Queen Show". The young ladies compete in the following rounds to prove that they are superior to the other delegates:
 Talent segment
 Evening Wear
 Carnival Costume
 Swimwear
 Interview segment

Jaycees Caribbean Queen Show
Jaycees Caribbean Queen Show Official Website

Organized by the Junior Chamber of Antigua and Barbuda, the Jaycees Caribbean Queen show has been existing since the 70s. The show sees competitors from across the Caribbean region compete for the coveted Jaycess crown. Territories such as, Anguilla, Antigua and Barbuda, Barbados, British Virgin Islands, Dominica, Guyana, Jamaica, Nevis, St. Kitts, St. Lucia, St. Vincent, St. Croix, and Trinidad and Tobago enter every year.

Antigua's representative is always the winner of the Antigua Queen of Carnival Competition just days before.

Notable former Jaycees Queens have been Kai Davis, Jermilla Kirwan, Shelana George, Shermain Jeremy (all four of Antigua) and Princess Best (of Barbados).

Calypso and Soca

Junior Calypso
The Junior Calypso competition seeks to keep the Calypso art form alive in the nation's children. The competition is divided into two segments, the 5 to 12 category and the 13 to 19 category. Each child sings one calypso and is judged on criteria that include performance, lyrics, clarity, content and use of stage.

Many of the Junior Calypso winners have gone on to compete in the Calypso Monarch Competition.

Notable winners are:
 Lyrics Man
 Thalia King
 Lady Challenger
 Young Destroyer
A'Shante (A'Shante O'Keiffe)

Party Monarch
The most well attended show for the Carnival season, Party Monarch, attracted over 11 thousand patrons in 2007 and approximately nine thousand in 2008. The competition is divided into two segments the Groovy and the Up-tempo. Ten competitors per segment compete for the title of Party Monarch. The Party Monarch sees many people of all ages come to listen to the local talent. The competitors sing Soca songs.

The Party Monarch competitions are also the fastest growing competitions and the artist are really developing. Some pundits are also expressing the view that Antigua's Soca is swiftly surpassing that of Trinidad.

The most notable winners of the Party Monarch competition are:
 Claudette "CP" Peters (winning four times)
 Mervyn "Sleepy" Edwards (three times)
 Toriano "Onyan" Edwards of the Burning Flames

Panorama
Steel Pan and Steel Orchestras are a big deal in Antigua with several pan yards around the island. These Pan players come into groups of about one hundred (some more, some less) and perform at Antigua's official Steel Pan competition, Panorama.

Some of the Steel Bands that perform are:
Gemonites
Harmonites
Ebonites
Hell's Gate
Halcyon
East Vybes

Visit the Carnival website for the history of the Steel Orchestras:
 History of Antigua's Steel Orchestras

Jam Bands

Jam bands, as they are called, are a significant part of the Carnival festivities. They lead the crowd during parades and they provide the music with which to dance. Several bands in Antigua have risen to much acclaim regionally and internationally.

Burning Flames
Red Hot Flames
El-A-Kru
Taxik
Revo Band
High Intensity
Lejah Band
Dred and the Bald head
Vision Band
Tonic Band
Tek Nine

These bands play mostly Soca music during the carnival season and attract hundreds of patrons who follow behind them to Carnival City.

Unofficial Carnival events
During the Carnival season in Antigua there are many events that take place that are not planned by the official carnival organizing body (Carnival Development Committee). These, while not official, are a very important part of the carnival season for patrons.

Pre carnival events such Blue Jeans, White Fete and Red Eye are very popular parties that usually take place over the weekends of July leading up to carnival.

"Lions Den" hosted by the Lions Club Antigua is the quintessential carnival "jam". It is executed in the form of a big rave and draws crowds of thousands. Two of Antigua's biggest bands, the Burning Flames and the Red Hot Flames perform.

See also
List of festivals in Antigua and Barbuda
List of festivals in North America
 Antigua and Barbuda
 Romantic Rhythms Music Festival
 Cricket carnival
 Music of Antigua
 Shermain Jeremy (Former Carnival Queen)
 Burning Flames (Antigua Soca Band)
 Marie-Elena John Antiguan novelist whose work highlights the African origins of Caribbean carnival

Gallery

External links
Carnival official website
Antigua Carnival 2005 BET Jazz via Youtube.com
Antigua Carnival Slide Show Youtube.com
Visual and textual information on the History of Carnival
View Claudette CP Peters Profile

Carnival
Music festivals in the Caribbean
Carnivals in Antigua and Barbuda
Folk festivals in Antigua and Barbuda